Angelica sinensis, commonly known as dong quai or female ginseng, is a herb belonging to the family Apiaceae, indigenous to China. Angelica sinensis grows in cool high altitude mountains in East Asia. The yellowish brown root of the plant is harvested in the fall and is a well-known Chinese medicine which has been used for thousands of years.

Pharmacology

Growing environment
Seedlings need to be kept out of direct sunlight, but the mature plant can withstand it. Angelica requires deep moist fertile soil and is perennial if prevented from going to seed.

Traditional Chinese medicine
The dried root of A. sinensis  commonly known as Chinese angelica  is widely used in traditional Chinese medicine, although there is insufficient evidence that it has any medicinal effect.

Adverse effects
There is evidence that A. sinensis may affect the muscles of the uterus. Women who are pregnant or planning on becoming pregnant should not use A. sinensis,  because it may induce a miscarriage. Taking A. sinensis can cause skin to become extra sensitive to the sun, leading to a greater risk for skin cancer.

Drug interactions
A. sinensis may increase the anticoagulant effects of the drug warfarin (as it contains coumarins) and consequently increase the risk of bleeding.

Due to the antiplatelet and anticoagulant effects of A. sinensis, it should be taken with caution with herbs or supplements (such as ginkgo, garlic, and ginger) that may slow blood clotting to reduce the possible risk of bleeding and bruising.

Chemistry
The plant's chemical constituents include phytosterols, polysaccharides, ligustilide, butylphthalide, cnidilide, isoenidilide, p-cymene, ferulate, and flavonoids.

See also
Angelica
Chinese herbology
Scutellaria baicalensis (Baikal skullcap)
Eleutherococcus senticosus or Siberian ginseng

References

External links

Angelica sinensis List of Chemicals (Dr. Duke's Databases)
Ontario Ministry of Agriculture and Food
Angelica Sinensis (Oliv.) Diels. Medicinal Plant Images Database (School of Chinese Medicine, Hong Kong Baptist University)  
當歸, Dang Gui, Chinese Angelica Chinese Medicine Specimen Database (School of Chinese Medicine, Hong Kong Baptist University) 

sinensis
Flora of Eastern Asia
Dietary supplements
Plants used in traditional Chinese medicine
Taxa named by Daniel Oliver
Taxa named by Ludwig Diels